The following is a complete list of racing cars manufactured by Ferrari.

Current

Past

Sports cars & GT
 1940 Auto Avio Costruzioni 815
 1947 125 S
 1947 159 S
 1948 166 S/SC/MM
 1950 195 S
 1950 275 S
 1951 340 America
 1951 212 Export
 1952 225 S
 1952 250 S
 1952 340 Mexico
 1953 250 MM
 1953 Ferrari-Abarth 166 MM/53
 1953 625 TF
 1953 735 S
 1953 500 Mondial
 1953 340 MM
 1953 375 MM
 1954 750 Monza
 1954 250 Monza
 1954 375 Plus
 1955 376 S
 1955 735 LM
 1955 410 S
 1955 857 S
 1956 500 TR
 1956 860 Monza
 1956 290 MM
 1956 625 LM
 1956 250 GT Berlinetta "Tour de France"
 1957 290 S
 1957 500 TRC
 1957 315 S
 1957 335 S
 1957 250 Testa Rossa
 1958 Dino 196 S
 1958 Dino 296 S
 1958 412 S
 1959 250 GT Berlinetta "SWB"
 1962 250 GT SWB Breadvan
 1960 Dino 246 S
 1960 250 TR60 
 1960 250 TRI/61
 1961 SP series
 1961 246 SP
 1962 196 SP
 1962 286 SP
 1962 248 SP
 1962 268 SP
 1962 330 TRI/LM
 1962 250 GTO
 1964 250 GTO/64
 1963 330 LM Berlinetta
 1963 P/LM series
 1963 250 P
 1964 250 LM
 1964 275 P
 1964 330 P
 1965 275 P2
 1965 330 P2
 1965 365 P2
 1966 330 P3
 1967 330 P4
 1967 412 P
 1965 Dino 166 P
 1965 Dino 206 SP
 1965 275 GTB Competizione
 1966 Dino 206 S
 1968 212 E Montagna
 1969 312 P
 1969 512 S and 512 M
 1971 312 PB
 1972 365 GTB/4 Daytona Competizione
 1979 512 BB LM
 1987 GTO Evoluzione
 1987 F40
 CSAI-GT
 LM
 GT
 GTE
 1994 333 SP
 1994 348 GT LM
 1995 F50 GT
 1995 F355 GT3
 2001 550 GTS
 2001 360 Modena GT/GTC
 2003 575M Maranello GTC
 2006 F430 GTC
 2007 F430 GT3
 2009 F430 Scuderia GT3
 2011 458 Italia GT2
 2011 458 Italia GT3
 2012 458 Italia Grand-Am
 2023 Ferrari 499P

Ferrari Challenge

 1993 348 Challenge
 1995 F355 Challenge
 2000 360 Modena Challenge
 2006 F430 Challenge
 2011 458 Challenge
 2013 458 Challenge Evo
 2017 488 Challenge
 2020 488 Challenge Evo

XX Programmes
 2005 FXX
 2008 FXX Evo
 2009 599XX
 2011 599XX Evo
 2015 FXX-K
 2017 FXX-K Evo

Formula One
 1948 125 F1
 1950 275 F1
 1950 340 F1
 1950 375 F1
 1951 212 F1
 1954 553 F1
 1954 625 F1
 1955 555 F1
 1955 Ferrari-Lancia D50
 1957 801 F1
 1958 246 F1
 1959 256 F1
 1960 246 P F1
 1961 156 F1
 1964 158 F1
 1964 512 F1 (aka 1512)
 1966 246 F1-66
 1966 312 F1
 1970 312 B
 1971 312 B2
 1973 312 B3
 1975 312 T
 1976 312 T2
 1978 312 T3
 1979 312 T4
 1980 312 T5
 1981 126 C
 1982 126 C2
 1983 126 C3
 1984 126 C4
 1985 156/85
 1986 F1-86
 1987 F1-87
 1988 F1-87/88C
 1989 640
 1990 641
 1991 642
 1991 643
 1992 F92A
 1993 F93A
 1994 412 T1
 1995 412 T2
 1996 F310
 1997 F310B
 1998 F300
 1999 F399
 2000 F1-2000
 2001 F2001
 2002 F2002
 2003 F2003-GA
 2004 F2004
 2005 F2005
 2006 248 F1
 2007 F2007
 2008 F2008
 2009 F60
 2010 F10
 2011 150° Italia
 2012 F2012
 2013 F138
 2014 F14 T
 2015 SF15-T
 2016 SF16-H
 2017 SF70H
 2018 SF71H
 2019 SF90
 2020 SF1000
 2021 SF21
 2022 F1-75
 2023 SF-23

Formula 2

 1948 166 F2
 1951 500 F2
 1953 553 F2
 1957 Dino 156 F2
 1960 156 F2
 1967 Dino 166 F2

Other single-seaters

 1949 166 FL
 1952 375 Indianapolis
 1958 326 MI
 1958 412 MI
 1968 Dino 246 Tasmania
 1986 637 CART

Special Projects

 2019 P80/C
 2020 Ferrari Omologata

See also
 List of Ferrari road cars
 List of Ferrari engines

References

External links
Ferrari Past Models on auto.ferrari.com
Ferrari Single-seaters on formula1.ferrari.com

Ferrari in motorsport
Ferrari competition cars, List of